Helmut Kuhne (born 6 September 1949, in Soest) is a German politician who served as a Member of the European Parliament from 1994 until 2009. He is a member of the Social Democratic Party of Germany, part of the Socialist Group.

During his time in parliament, Kuhne sat on the European Parliament's Committee on Foreign Affairs. He was also a member of the Delegation for relations with the United States.

Education
 1973: Graduate in sociology

Career
 1974-1994: Worked at Lippstadt Protestant Grammar School and in various adult education establishments, latterly as research assistant at the Regional Institute for School and Further Education, North Rhine-Westphalia, in Soest
 Since October 2000, taught intermittently at the Faculty for Social Sciences, Ruhr University, Bochum
 1974-1978: Chairman of the Young Socialists, Western Westphalia district
 1978-2000: Member of the Western Westphalia SPD District Executive
 1984-1994: Member of Soest District Council
 1991-1999: Member of the WDR Broadcasting Council

External links
 
 
 

1949 births
Living people
MEPs for Germany 2004–2009
Social Democratic Party of Germany MEPs
MEPs for Germany 1994–1999
MEPs for Germany 1999–2004